The Exploration of the Colorado River and Its Canyons by John Wesley Powell is a classic of American exploration literature. It is about the Powell Geographic Expedition of 1869 which was the first trip down the Colorado River by boat, including the first trip through the Grand Canyon. 

Powell's first written accounts of his exploration appeared in the January, February and March 1875 editions of Scribner’s Monthly as "The Canons of the Colorado". The Smithsonian published it in book form in 1875 under title Report of the Exploration of the Colorado River of the West and Its Tributaries. Explored in 1869, 1870, 1871, and 1872, under the direction of the Secretary of the Smithsonian Institution. It was revised and published in 1895 as The Exploration of the Colorado River and Its Canyons.

It includes hundreds of wood engravings based on photographs by E.O. Beaman, James Fennemore and John Karl Hillers, and drawings by Thomas Moran.

Notes

External links
The Exploration of the Colorado River, by John Wesley Powell, 1875, via Internet Archive, Project Gutenberg and Google Books (scanned books original editions color illustrated)

1875 non-fiction books
Exploration
Books about Arizona
Books about Colorado
Books about Utah
Books about Wyoming